Professor Creeps is a 1942 American comedy film directed by William Beaudine and starring Mantan Moreland.

Cast
 Mantan Moreland as Washington
 F. E. Miller as Jefferson
 Arthur Ray as Professor Whackingham Creeps
 Florence O'Brien as Daffodil Dixon
 Maceo Bruce Sheffield as Shylock the Landlord
 John Lester Johnson as Keeper
 Marguerite Whitten as Mrs. Green
 Shelton Brooks as Jackson
 Jessie Cryer as Mr. Green

References

External links
 

1942 films
1942 comedy films
American comedy films
American black-and-white films
Films directed by William Beaudine
Race films
Toddy Pictures Company films
1940s American films